The Combat Air Museum is a non-profit aviation museum at Topeka Regional Airport (Forbes Field) in Shawnee County, near Topeka, Kansas. The museum is dedicated to the creation of facilities and resources for the education of the local and regional communities through the collection, preservation, conservation and exhibition of aircraft, information, artifacts, technology and art associated with the military aviation history of the United States.

History 
In the autumn of 1976, the Combat Air Museum in Topeka, Kansas organized as a wing of Yesterday's Air Force (YAF) (of David Tallichet). In 1979, the group reorganized as "Combat Air Museum," relocating to Forbes Field Hangar #602.

Exhibits 

Today, the museum has 43 aircraft, mostly military (mostly American), representing World War I to the present day (especially jets from the 1950s to the 1980s), plus various aircraft engines, military vehicles and other military displays.

Aircraft

World War I 

 Airco DH-2 – replica
 Curtiss JN-4D – replica
 Fokker Dr.I – replica
 Fokker E.IV – replica
 Nieuport 27 – flying replica
 Royal Aircraft Factory S.E.5 – replica
 Sopwith Scout – full-scale replica
 Etrich Taube – scale replica
 Pfalz E.I – scale replica

World War II 

 Beech SNB-5
 Cessna AT-17 Bobcat
 Douglas C-47D Skytrain "Kilroy"
 Fairchild UC-61K Forwarder
 Messerschmitt Bf 109 G-10 – scale mockup
 Meyers OTW Serial #1
 North American Harvard IV
 Vultee BT-13 Valiant

Cold War 

 Beech RU-8D Seminole
 Grumman US-2A Tracker
 Lockheed EC-121T Warning Star
 Douglas F3D-2 Skyknight
 Douglas TA-4J Skyhawk
 Grumman F9F-5 Panther
 Grumman F11F-1 Tiger
 Grumman F-14A Tomcat
 Lockheed T-33A Shooting Star
 McDonnell F-101B Voodoo
 McDonnell F-4D Phantom II
 Mikoyan-Gurevich MiG-21PF
 North American F-86H Sabre
 PZL-Mielec Lim-2
 PZL-Mielec Lim-6R
 Republic F-84F Thunderstreak
 Republic F-105D Thunderchief

Helicopters 

 Bell UH-1H Iroquois
 Bell UH-1M Iroquois
 Hiller OH-23A Raven – under reconstruction
 Sikorsky CH-53A Sea Stallion
 Sikorsky CH-54B Tarhe

Drones 

 MMIST CQ-10 Snowgoose
 Ryan BQM-34 Firebee

See also

 Cosmosphere in Hutchinson
 Kansas Aviation Museum in Wichita
 Mid-America Air Museum in Liberal
 Kansas World War II army airfields
 List of aerospace museums
 List of museums in Kansas

References

External links

 
 Combat Air Museum Information – KansasTravel.org

Aerospace museums in Kansas
Museums in Shawnee County, Kansas
Military and war museums in Kansas